Admire Groove (in Japanese: アドマイヤグルーヴ, foaled April 30th, 2000) is a Japanese Thoroughbred racehorse and the winner of the 2003 and 2004  Queen Elizabeth II Cup.

Career

Admire Groove's first race was on November 10th, 2002 at Kyoto, where she came in first. She then won her next two races after at Hashin Racecourse, which included a win at the Wakaba Stakes.

Admire Groove's first major win was at the Grade-2 Rose Stakes on September 21st, 2003. She came close to capturing the October Shūka Sho just weeks later, but finished in 2nd. She then picked up her first Grade-1 victory, by winning the 2003  Queen Elizabeth II Cup.
 She picked up another win at the July 11th, 2004 Mermaid Stakes.

Admire Groove then returned to the  Queen Elizabeth II Cup in 2004, where she successfully defended her title.
 Groove tried to repeat the feat again at the 2005  Queen Elizabeth II Cup, but finished in 3rd place.

On December 18th, 2005, she grabbed her final win in her last race by winning the 2005 Hanshin Himba Stakes.

Stud career
Admire Groove's descendants include:

c = colt, f = filly

Pedigree

References

2000 racehorse births
Racehorses bred in Japan
Racehorses trained in Japan
Thoroughbred family 8-f